Koj is a surname. Notable people with the surname include:
 Sabah Koj,  Australian fashion model
 Aleksander Koj, Polish physician and scientist
 Michał Koj,  Polish footballer part of Górnik Zabrze

See also